Yalil Guerra Soto (born April 27, 1973, Havana, Cuba) is a Cuban, Spanish, and American composer, classical guitarist, producer, arranger, professor, multi-instrumentalist, and conductor, based in the city of Los Angeles, California. He is the son of the Cuban vocal duo Rosell y Cary.

Career
Guerra has written music for mixed choir and a variety of classical ensembles as well as music for the US TV network Univision and for the 2010 FIFA World Cup. On November 15, 2012, Guerra won the Latin Grammy in the Best Classical Contemporary Composition for his work "Seducción" from his album “Live in L.A.”

In 2010, Guerra was nominated for a Latin Grammy in the Best Classical Album category for his album "Old Havana."

The album titled "Cuba: The Legacy" was nominated in 2019 for a Latin Grammy in the Best Classical Album category.

Studies
Guerra graduated from the National School of Music (E.N.A.) in Havana, Cuba with a Bachelor in Music degree in 1991. He obtained a Master's degree from the  Conservatorio Superior de Música de Madrid, Spain in 1997 and from Shepherd University in Los Angeles in 2016. He graduated with a Doctor of Philosophy in Music from the University of California, Los Angeles in 2021.

References

External links
 Official Website

1973 births
Living people
Cuban composers
Male composers
Instituto Superior de Arte alumni
Cuban male musicians